Sefid Barg (also Romanized as Sefīd Barg) is a village in Sharvineh Rural District, Kalashi District, Javanrud County, Kermanshah Province, Iran. At the 2006 census, its population was 568, in 121 families.

References 

Populated places in Javanrud County